Ek Jhoothi Love Story is a 2020 Pakistani drama web series. The web series stars Bilal Abbas Khan, Syeda Madiha Imam, Kinza Razzak, Kiran Haq, Furqan Qureshi and Mariam Saleem. It has been directed by Mehreen Jabbar and produced by Shailja Mukherjee. The story revolves around two individuals who in order to find their perfect life partner catfish each other and create fake profiles on social media. The series premiered on 30 October 2020 through ZEE5.

Premise
Salma and Sohail belong to middle-class families but have high expectations for their ideal life partner. So, in the pursuit to find their ideal match and true love, they both create a fake social media profile for themselves and continue on their quest to identify their idea love interest.

Cast
 Bilal Abbas Khan as Sohail
 Syeda Madiha Imam as Salma
 Kinza Razzak as Natalia
 Aliee Shaikh as Professor Jahangir 
 Kiran Haq as Shabana
 Furqan Qureshi as Salahuddin
 Mariam Saleem as Shazia
 Syed Mohammad Ahmed
 Beo Raana Zafar as Nusrat Jahan
 Kinza Razzak as Natalia
 Kiran Haq as Shabana
 Srha Asghar as Choti
 Ahmed Zeb as Nofil
 Fawad Khan as Tanzeel ur Rehman Siddiqui

Release
Ek Jhoothi Love Story was released on ZEE5, an Indian streaming platform and was available to audiences across the world. The series started streaming from 30 October 2020.

Reception
Tatsam Mukherjee from Firstpost to a major extent shared positive reviews on the web series, he appreciated the strong performances of the cast. However, he was a bit unconvinced that the series wasn’t able to shrug off the daily soap opera.

Archika Khurrana from Times Of India rated the series 2.5 out of 5 stars and stated that the series showcases a refreshing take on modern romance however as the plot progresses it turns into an average romantic tale.

Maliha Rehman from Scroll.in highly appreciated the director Mehreen Jabbar, and stated her direction as perfect and flawless. She further wrote that a well-chosen cast were beautifully able to portray this story, which is true to Pakistan.

References

External links
 
 Ek Jhoothi Love Story on ZEE5

Pakistani web series
2020 Pakistani television series debuts
Pakistani drama television series
Zee Zindagi original programming
Urdu-language television shows
2020 web series debuts